NHG may refer to:

 The New Hampshire Gazette
 New High German
 the ISO 639-3 code for the Tetelcingo Nahuatl language
 National Healthcare Group, a group of healthcare institutions in Singapore
 London Underground station code for Notting Hill Gate tube station